Knar Haykakan (in Armenian Քնար Հայկական meaning Armenian Lyre) was a pioneering Armenian musical periodical published twice a month. It was first published from 1857 until 1858. Its purpose was to keep the musical spirit among Armenians alive. It also published musical lessons based on Armenian and European music.

It resumed publication in 1861 as Knar Arevelyan (in Armenian Քնար Արեւելեան meaning Eastern Lyre) with main editor as Gabriel Yeranian in collaboration with Tigran Tchouhadjyan and Nikoghos Tashjian. 

After the death of Yeranian in 1862, Tigran Tchouhadjyan took over as main editor and ensured continuation of the publication starting 1862 until 1864. This coincided with the establishment of the Armenian Lyre Society in Constantinople in 1862 with the periodical covering the activities of the association.

References
 Grigor Suni, Armenian music, Yerevan, 2005, p. 106-107, 

Armenian journals
1857 establishments in the Ottoman Empire